The following is an overview of 1927 in film, including significant events, a list of films released and notable births and deaths.

Top-grossing films (U.S.)
The top ten 1927 released films by box office gross in North America are as follows:

Events
 
January 10 – Fritz Lang's science-fiction fantasy Metropolis premieres in Germany. The film receives its American premiere in New York City on March 6.
March 11 – World's largest movie theatre, the Roxy Theatre, opens in New York City.
April 7 – Abel Gance's Napoleon often considered his best known and greatest masterpiece, premieres (in a shortened version) at the Paris Opéra and demonstrates techniques and equipment that will not be revived for years to come, such as hand-held cameras, and what is often considered the first widescreen projection format Polyvision. It will be more than three decades before films with a widescreen format would again be attempted.
May 11 – The Academy of Motion Picture Arts and Sciences is founded in Los Angeles by Douglas Fairbanks. The 1st Academy Awards (Oscars) will be awarded to films which are released in 1927 or 1928.
August 12 – Paramount's dramatic film Wings, which will go on to win the first Academy Award for Best Picture, opens at the Criterion Theater in New York City, with an unheard-of roadshow admission price of $2.00 per ticket.
September 5 – Nicholas Schenck becomes president of Loews Inc. following the death of Marcus Loew.
September 7 – Oswald the Lucky Rabbit debuts in Trolley Troubles.
September 23 – Fox Films acquires the rights to the Tri-Ergon sound-on-film technology, which had been developed in 1919 by three German inventors, Josef Engl, Hans Vogt, and Joseph Massole.
October 6 – The Jazz Singer, starring Al Jolson, premieres at the Warner Theater in New York City. Although not the first 'talkie', The Jazz Singer becomes the first box-office hit and popularizes sound motion pictures. It is the highest-grossing movie up to this time.
December 3 – The silent short Putting Pants on Philip, the first official billing of comedy duo Laurel and Hardy, is released in the United States.
 Ang Manananggal, the first Filipino horror film, is released in the Philippines.
 Cinematograph Films Act sets a minimum quota for British films to be shown in British cinemas.
 Italian Alberto Rabagliati wins a Rudolph Valentino look-alike contest and moves to Hollywood to start his acting career.
 The Three Tramps, the first Filipino comedy film featuring the Silos brothers, is released in the Philippines.

Academy Awards
Best Production: Wings
Best Artistic Quality: Sunrise
Best Actor: Emil Jannings for The Way of All Flesh and the 1928 movie The Last Command
Best Actress: Janet Gaynor for Seventh Heaven and Sunrise, as well as the 1928 movie Street Angel
Best Director: Frank Borzage for Seventh Heaven

Notable films released in 1927
For the complete list of US film releases for the year, see United States films of 1927

#
7th Heaven, directed by Frank Borzage, starring Janet Gaynor and Charles Farrell

A
Ang Manananggal, directed by José Nepomuceno, starring Mary Walter – (Philippines)
Annie Laurie, directed by John S. Robertson, starring Lillian Gish and Norman Kerry

B
Bed and Sofa (Tretya meshchanskaya), directed by Abram Room – (U.S.S.R.)
The Beloved Rogue, directed by Alan Crosland, starring John Barrymore, Conrad Veidt and Marceline Day
Belphégor, directed by Henri Desfontaines – (France)
Berlin: Symphony of a Metropolis (Berlin: Die Sinfonie der Großstadt), directed by Walter Ruttmann – (Germany)
Bigamy (Bigamie), directed by Jaap Speyer, starring Heinrich George – (Germany)
Blighty, directed by Adrian Brunel, starring Ellaline Terriss and Lillian Hall-Davis – (GB)
The Bugle Call (lost), directed by Edward Sedgwick, starring Jackie Coogan

C
The Cat and the Canary, directed by Paul Leni, starring Laura La Plante and Creighton Hale, based on the 1922 stage play by John Willard
Chicago, directed by Frank Urson, starring Phyllis Haver
Children of Divorce, directed by Frank Lloyd, starring Clara Bow, Esther Ralston and Gary Cooper
The Chinese Parrot (lost), directed by Paul Leni
The Club of the Big Deed (Soyuz velikogo dela), directed by Grigori Kozintsev and Leonid Trauberg – (U.S.S.R.)
College, directed by James W. Horne and Buster Keaton, starring Buster Keaton
Confetti, directed by Graham Cutts, starring Jack Buchanan and Annette Benson – (GB)

D
The Dove, directed by Roland West, starring Norma Talmadge, Noah Beery Sr. and Gilbert Roland
Downhill, directed by Alfred Hitchcock, starring Ivor Novello and Isabel Jeans – (GB)
The Drop Kick, directed by Millard Webb, starring Richard Barthelmess

E
Easy Pickings, directed by George Archainbaud, starring Anna Q. Nilsson, based on the stage play by Paul A. Kruger and William A. Burton
Education of a Prince (Éducation de Prince), directed by Henri Diamant-Berger – (France)
The End of St. Petersburg (Konets Sankt-Peterburga), directed by Vsevolod Pudovkin – (U.S.S.R.)

F
The Fair Co-Ed, directed by Sam Wood; starring Marion Davies and Johnny Mack Brown
The Filipino Woman (La Mujer Filipina), directed by José Nepomuceno – (Philippines)
The First Auto, directed by Roy Del Ruth, starring Barney Oldfield and Patsy Ruth Miller
Flesh and the Devil, directed by Clarence Brown, starring John Gilbert, Greta Garbo and Lars Hanson
The Forty-First (Sorok pervyy), directed by Yakov Protazanov – (U.S.S.R.)

G
The Gaucho, directed by F. Richard Jones, starring Douglas Fairbanks and Lupe Vélez
Ghost Train (Der Geisterzug), directed by Géza von Bolváry, starring Guy Newall – (GB/Germany)
The Gorilla (lost), directed by Alfred Santell, starring Charles Murray and Walter Pidgeon, based on the 1925 stage play by Ralph Spence

H
Her Wild Oat, directed by Marshall Neilan, starring Colleen Moore
His First Flame, directed by Harry Edwards, starring Harry Langdon
His Greatest Bluff (Sein größter Bluff), directed by Henrik Galeen and Harry Piel – (Germany)
The Honorable Mr. Buggs, directed by Fred Jackman, starring Matt Moore, Anna May Wong and Oliver Hardy
Hot Kisses, directed by José Nepomuceno – (Philippines)
Hula, directed by Victor Fleming, starring Clara Bow
Husband Hunters, directed by John G. Adolfi, starring Mae Busch, Jean Arthur and Mildred Harris

I
It, directed by Clarence G. Badger, starring Clara Bow and Antonio Moreno

J
The Jazz Singer, directed by Alan Crosland, starring Al Jolson, May McAvoy and Warner Oland
Johann the Coffinmaker, directed by Robert Florey 
Johnny Get Your Hair Cut, directed by B. Reeves Eason and Archie Mayo, starring Jackie Coogan and Harry Carey

K
The Kid Brother, directed by Ted Wilde, starring Harold Lloyd and Jobyna Ralston
The King of Kings, directed by Cecil B. DeMille, starring H. B. Warner, Dorothy Cumming and Joseph Schildkraut

L
The Lady in Ermine (lost), directed by James Flood, starring Corinne Griffith
The Lodger: A Story of the London Fog, directed by Alfred Hitchcock, starring Ivor Novello, based on the novel by Marie Belloc Lowndes – (GB)
London After Midnight (lost), written and directed by Tod Browning, starring Lon Chaney, Marceline Day and Conrad Nagel
Long Pants, directed by Frank Capra, starring Harry Langdon
The Love of Jeanne Ney (Die Liebe der Jeanne Ney), directed by G.W. Pabst – (Germany)
The Love of Sunya, directed by Albert Parker, starring Gloria Swanson
The Loves of Carmen, directed by Raoul Walsh, starring Dolores del Río and Victor McLaglen

M
Madame Pompadour, directed by Herbert Wilcox, starring Dorothy Gish and Antonio Moreno – (GB)
Man from the Restaurant (Chelovek iz restorana), directed by Yakov Protazanov – (U.S.S.R.)
The Manor House of Fear (Le Manoir de la Peur), directed by Alfred Machin and Henry Wulschleger, starring Romuald Joubé – (France)
Mata Hari, directed by Friedrich Feher, starring Magda Sonja – (Germany)
Metropolis, directed by Fritz Lang, starring Alfred Abel – (Germany)
Mockery, directed by Benjamin Christensen, starring Lon Chaney and Ricardo Cortez
The Mountain Eagle (lost), directed by Alfred Hitchcock, starring Nita Naldi – (GB/Germany)
My Best Girl, directed by Sam Taylor, starring Mary Pickford and Charles "Buddy" Rogers

N
Napoléon, directed by Abel Gance, starring Albert Dieudonné – (France)
Noidan Kirot (The Curse of the Witch), directed by Teuvo Puro – (Finland)

O
The Only Way, directed by Herbert Wilcox, starring John Martin Harvey and Madge Stuart – (GB)

P
The Patent Leather Kid, directed by Alfred Santell, starring Richard Barthelmess
Prelude, written and directed by Castleton Knight, based on the short story The Premature Burial by Edgar Allan Poe – (GB)
The Private Life of Helen of Troy (lost), directed by Alexander Korda, starring María Corda, Lewis Stone and Ricardo Cortez

Q
Quality Street, directed by Sidney Franklin, starring Marion Davies and Conrad Nagel
The Queen of Spades, directed by Aleksandr Razumny, based on the 1833 short story Pikovaya Dama by Alexander Pushkin – (Germany)
Quinneys, directed by Maurice Elvey, starring John Longden and Alma Taylor – (GB)

R
The Red Mill, directed by William Goodrich (Roscoe "Fatty" Arbuckle), starring Marion Davies
The Ring, directed by Alfred Hitchcock, starring Carl Brisson and Lillian Hall-Davis – (GB)
Robinson Crusoe, directed by M. A. Wetherell, based on the novel by Daniel Defoe – (GB)
Romance of the Western Chamber, directed by Hou Yao – (China)

S
The Scar of Shame, directed by Frank Peregini
Shooting Stars, directed by Anthony Asquith and A.V. Bramble – (GB)
The Show, directed by Tod Browning, starring John Gilbert, Renée Adorée and Lionel Barrymore, based on the 1910 novel The Day of Souls by Charles Tenney Jackson
Singed, directed by John Griffith Wray, starring Blanche Sweet and Warner Baxter
Slide, Kelly, Slide, directed by Edward Sedgwick, starring William Haines, Sally O'Neil and Harry Carey
Sorrell and Son, directed by Herbert Brenon, starring H. B. Warner and Anna Q. Nilsson – (GB)
Spring Fever, directed by Edward Sedgwick, starring William Haines, Joan Crawford and George K. Arthur
The Student Prince in Old Heidelberg, directed by Ernst Lubitsch, starring Ramón Novarro and Norma Shearer
Sunrise: A Song of Two Humans, directed by F. W. Murnau, starring Janet Gaynor and George O'Brien
Svengali, directed by Gennaro Righelli, starring Paul Wegener, based on the 1894 novel Trilby by George du Maurier – (Germany)

T
The Three Tramps, directed by Manuel Silos – (Philippines)
Tillie the Toiler, directed by Hobart Henley, starring Marion Davies
Topsy and Eva, directed by Del Lord, starring Rosetta Duncan and Vivian Duncan
Twelve Miles Out, directed by Jack Conway, starring John Gilbert, Ernest Torrence and Joan Crawford

U
Uncle Tom's Cabin, directed by Harry A. Pollard
Underworld, directed by Josef von Sternberg, starring Clive Brook, Evelyn Brent and George Bancroft
The Unknown, directed by Tod Browning, starring Lon Chaney, Norman Kerry and Joan Crawford

W
The Way of All Flesh (lost), directed by Victor Fleming, starring Emil Jannings
West Point, directed by Edward Sedgwick, starring William Haines and Joan Crawford
When a Man Loves, directed by Alan Crosland, starring John Barrymore, Dolores Costello and Warner Oland
Why Girls Love Sailors, directed by Fred Guiol, starring Stan Laurel and Oliver Hardy
Wings, directed by William A. Wellman, starring Clara Bow, Charles 'Buddy' Rogers, Richard Arlen and Gary Cooper
The Wizard (lost), directed by Richard Rosson, starring Edmund Lowe and Leila Hyams, based on the 1911 novel Balaoo by Gaston Leroux

Comedy film series
Harold Lloyd (1913–1938)
Buster Keaton (1917–1944)
Our Gang (1922–1944)
Harry Langdon (1924–1936)
Laurel and Hardy (1921–1945)

Animated short film series
Felix the Cat (1919–1962)
Aesop's Film Fables (1921–1933)
Ko-Ko Song Car-Tunes (1924-1927)
Alice Comedies
 Alice the Golf Bug
 Alice Foils the Pirates
 Alice at the Carnival
 Alice at the Rodeo
 Alice the Collegiate
 Alice in the Alps
 Alice's Auto Race
 Alice's Circus Daze
 Alice's Knaughty Knight
 Alice's Three Bad Eggs
 Alice's Picnic
 Alice's Channel Swim
 Alice in the Klondike
 Alice's Medicine Show
 Alice the Whaler
 Alice the Beach Nut
 Alice in the Big League
Krazy Kat (1925–1940)
Un-Natural History (1925-1927)
Pete the Pup (1926-1927)
Inkwell Imps (1927–1929)
Oswald the Lucky Rabbit
 Trolley Troubles
 Oh Teacher
 The Mechanical Cow
 Great Guns!
 All Wet
 The Ocean Hop
 The Banker's Daughter
 Empty Socks
 Rickety Gin
Newslaffs (1927–1928)

Births
January 4 – Barbara Rush, American actress
January 10 – Lee Philips, American actor (died 1999) 
January 15 – Phyllis Coates, American actress
January 17 – Eartha Kitt, American actress and singer (died 2008)
January 22 – Walter Sparrow, English actor (died 2000)
January 28 – Hiroshi Teshigahara, Japanese director (died 2001)
January 29 – Peter Fernandez, American actor, voice director and writer (died 2010)
January 31 – Jean Speegle Howard, American actress (died 2000)
February 3 – Kenneth Anger, American underground experimental filmmaker and actor
February 7 – Juliette Gréco, French singer and actress (died 2020)
February 12
Eric Mason, British actor (died 2010)
H. M. Wynant, American actor
February 14 – Lois Maxwell, Canadian actress (died 2007)
February 16 – June Brown, English actress (died 2022)
February 20 – Sidney Poitier, American actor (died 2022)
March 1 – Harry Belafonte, American actor and singer
March 7 – James Broderick, American actor and director (died 1982)
March 18 - George Plimpton, American actor (died 2003)
March 20 – Cairbre (also known as Leo), Dublin Zoo-born Metro-Goldwyn-Mayer lion mascot
March 21 – Virginia Weidler, American actress (died 1968)
March 25 – Monique van Vooren, Belgian-American actress (died 2020)
March 31 – William Daniels, American actor
April 1 – Maria Eugénia, Portuguese actress (died 2016)
April 2 
Rita Gam, American actress (died 2016)
Ken Sansom, American actor and voice actor (died 2012)
April 5 – Chao-Li Chi, Shanxi-born actor (died 2010)
April 13 – Maurice Ronet, French film actor, director and writer (died 1983)
April 16 – Peter Mark Richman, American actor (died 2021)
April 19 – Cora Sue Collins, American former child actress
April 30 – Ellen Alaküla, Estonian actress (died 2011)
May 5 – Pat Carroll, American actress (died 2022)
May 6 – Ettore Manni, Italian actor (died 1979)
May 11
Bernard Fox, Welsh actor (died 2016)
Mort Sahl, Canadian-born American comedian and actor (died 2021)
May 13 – Herbert Ross, American film director, producer and choreographer (died 2001)
May 20 – David Hedison, American actor (died 2019)
May 21 – Kay Kendall, English actress, comedienne (died 1959)
May 22 – Michael Constantine, Greek American actor (died 2021)
May 30 – Clint Walker, American actor (died 2018)
May 31 – Koreyoshi Kurahara, Malaysian-Japanese screenwriter, director (died 2002)
June 2 – Thomas Hill (actor), Indian-born American character actor (died 2009)
June 8 – Jerry Stiller, American actor and comedian (died 2020)
June 15 – Ottó Foky, Hungarian animator (died 2012)
June 23 – Bob Fosse, American dancer, musical theater choreographer, director, screenwriter and director (died 1987)
June 27 – Geoffrey Palmer, British actor (died 2020)
June 30 – Mario Lanfranchi, Italian director, screenwriter, producer and actor (died 2022)
July 2 - Brock Peters, American actor and singer (died 2005)
July 4
Gina Lollobrigida, Italian actress (died 2023)
Neil Simon, American playwright and screenwriter (died 2018)
July 5 – Beverly Tyler, American actress, singer (died 2005)
July 6 – Janet Leigh, American actress (died 2004)
July 7 – Henry O, Chinese-American actor
July 9
Ed Ames, American singer and actor
Susan Cabot, American actress (died 1986)
July 15
Nan Martin, American actress (died 2010)
Joe Turkel, American character actor (died 2022)
July 30
Richard Johnson, British actor, writer and producer (died 2015)
Joan Vohs, American model, actress (died 2001)
August 9 – Robert Shaw, British actor and novelist (died 1978)
August 14 – Roger Carel (Bancharel), French voice actor (died 2020)
August 19 – L. Q. Jones, American actor (died 2022)
August 30 – Bill Daily, American actor (died 2018)
September 12
Freddie Jones, English actor (died 2019)
Franco Latini, Italian actor and voice actor (died 1991)
September 13 - Beverly Polcyn, American actress (died 2018)
September 16 – Peter Falk, American actor (died 2011)
September 19 
Rosemary Harris, English actress
William Hickey, American actor (died 1997)
September 21 - Joan Hotchkis, American actress and writer (died 2022)
September 24 – Arthur Malet, English actor (died 2013)
September 26 - Patrick O'Neal (actor), American actor (died 1994)
October 1 – Tom Bosley, American actor (died 2010)
October 7 - Al Martino, American singer and actor (died 2009)
October 14 – Roger Moore, English actor (died 2017)
October 15 – Jeannette Charles, retired British actress
October 16 – Eileen Ryan, American actress (died 2022)
October 18 – George C. Scott, American film and stage actor (died 1999)
October 21 - Howard Zieff, American director and producer (died 2009)
October 27 – Silvia Laidla, Estonian actress (died 2012) 
October 31 – Lee Grant, American actress
November 1 – Marcel Ophuls, German documentary maker
November 3 - Florence Paterson, Canadian actress (died 1995)
November 12 – John Hollis, British screen actor (died 2005)
November 17
Fenella Fielding, English actress (died 2018)
Lynn Stalmaster, American casting director (died 2021)
November 14 – McLean Stevenson, American actor (died 1996)
November 20 – Estelle Parsons, American actress
November 23 – Sybil Jason, American actress (died 2011)
November 30 – Robert Guillaume, American actor and singer (died 2017)
December 29 – Giorgio Capitani, Italian film director and screenwriter (died 2017)
December 30 – Bernard Barrow, American Actor (died 1993)

Deaths
January 13 – Arnold Daly, American actor, playwright and producer (born 1875)
March 17 – Charles Emmett Mack, American actor (born 1900)
April 25 – Earle Williams, American actor (born 1880)
May 7 – Bruce McRae, American stage and screen actor (born 1867)
May 16 – Sam Bernard, English stage and screen actor (born 1863)
May 20 – Oscar Stribolt, Danish actor (born 1873) 
June 3 – Einar Hanson, Swedish stage and screen actor (born 1897)
June 4 – Robert McKim, American actor (born 1886)
July 26 – June Mathis, American screenwriter (born 1889)
September 5 – Marcus Loew, American theater chain executive & founder of Loews Theaters (born 1870)
October 5 – Sam Warner, American co-founder of Warner Brothers studios (born 1887)
October 13 – Hughie Mack, American actor (born 1884)
November 4 – Valli Valli, German stage and film actress (born 1882)
December 6 – Kate Toncray, American actress (born 1867)
December 16 – Romaine Fielding, American actor and director (born 1868)
December 24 – Julia Bruns, American stage & film actress (born 1895)

Film debuts
 Robert Armstrong – The Main Event
 Claudette Colbert – For the Love of Mike
 Sylvia Sidney - Broadway Nights
 Ann Sothern – Broadway Nights
 Barbara Stanwyck – Broadway Nights
 Lupe Vélez – What Women Did for Me
 Fred Zinneman, director and producer – The March of the Machines

See also
List of American films of 1927

References

 
Film by year